The 1991 San Francisco Bay Blackhawks season was the club's second in the American Professional Soccer League and their third season overall. The Blackhawks finished
with the second-best overall record and went on to win the championship, beating the Albany Capitals in the finals.

Squad
The 1991 squad

Competitions

APSL

Match results

Season

Playoffs 

* = Shootout@ = Forfeit# = Series tied, 1-1. S. F. Bay wins mini-gameSource:

Standings

Western Conference

References

External links
The Year in American Soccer – 1991 | APSL
San Francisco Bay Blackhawks Game Results | Soccerstats.us

1991 in sports in California
San Francisco Bay Blackhawks
American soccer clubs 1991 season